The Peach Music Festival is a music festival started by the Allman Brothers Band and Live Nation Entertainment that has been held annually since 2012 at the Pavilion at Montage Mountain and Montage Mountain Ski Resort in Scranton, Pennsylvania. One exception was in 2020.

History
The Peach Music Festival was billed as the first ever Allman Brothers inspired music festival in northeastern Pennsylvania, and attracts thousands of people each year. Festival-goers are encouraged to shop at the many food and craft vendors on the grounds of the festival and are offered free access to the Montage Mountain Ski Resort, which is transformed into a large water park in the summer months, giving them the opportunity to utilize the park's many water rides and attractions while listening to the musicians performing. Camping and RV Parking is also offered on the grounds. The festival takes place in late-July over the course of four days, from Thursday to Sunday, and has a variety of different musical performers, and special events each day.

The COVID-19 pandemic in 2020 caused the 9th to be cancelled and deferred to 2021.

Festival lineups

2022
The Peach Music Festival 2022 took place from June 30 to July 3,headlined by Billy Strings, Joe Russo’s Almost Dead, Trey Anastasio Band and Black Crowes.

2021
After skipping 2020 because of the Covid-19 pandemic, The Peach Music Festival 2021 took place from July 1 to July 4, headlined by Pigeons Playing Ping Pong (2 sets), Joe Russo’s Almost Dead (2 sets), Oysterhead, and The String Cheese Incident (2 sets).

2019
The Peach Music Festival 2019 took place from July 25 to July 28, headlined by String Cheese Incident (3 sets), Trey Anastasio Band (2 sets) and Phil Lesh & Friends.

2018
The Peach Music Festival 2018 was held July 19 thru July 22. Headliners were Phil Lesh & the Terrapin Family band, Gov't mule and JRAD. Late night set with "Dark Side Of The Mule". Dickey Betts played with his band joined by his son Duane.

2017
The Peach Music Festival 2017 was held from August 10 thru 13. Headliners were Widespread Panic appearing 2 nights, My Morning jacket, Govt. Mule & Friends, Joe Bonamassa , Umphrey’s Mcgee for 2 sets and Joe Russo’s Almost Dead also for 2 sets.

2016
The Peach Music Festival 2016 was from August 11–14. Headliners were Trey Anastasio band, Gregg Allman, String Cheese Incident, Govt.Mule nd also a set of Gregg Allman together with String Cheese Incident.

2015
The Peach Music Festival 2015 took place from August 13 to August 16, headlined by Gregg Allman, Santana and a special version of Bill Kreutzmann’s Billy & The Kids featuring the drummer’s Grateful Dead band mate Bob Weir. The Allman Brothers performed without Derek Trucks.

2014
The third annual Peach Music Festival took place on August 14–17. The festival was scheduled to be headlined by The Allman Brothers, Bob Weir & RatDog, and Trey Anastasio Band. For unspecified reasons, Bob Weir canceled summer tour dates ranging from August 14 through September 14. As a result, the Trey Anastasio Band received an extra headlining slot on Friday night. The festival featured a set in which The Allman Brothers Band performed the Eat A Peach album in its entirety. This was especially notable because it would be the second to last time the band would perform a festival with the guitarist duo of Derek Trucks and Warren Haynes (the final festival performance being the Lockn' Festival a month later). According to interviews with Rolling Stone, both guitarists decided to focus on their other projects. Derek Trucks said "I feel that my solo project and the Tedeschi Trucks Band is where my future and creative energy lies...The Tedeschi Trucks Band tour schedule keeps growing, and I feel the time has finally come to focus on a single project, which will allow me to spend that rare time off the road with my family and children. It's a difficult decision to make, and I don't make it lightly.” Following the conclusion of Eat A Peach, The Allman Brothers encored with the song "Little Martha," which served as a heartfelt tribute to the band's deceased co-founder Duane Allman.

2013

2012
The Allman Brothers Band hosted the first Peach Music Festival at Scranton PA’s Montage Mountain from August 10–12. In addition to The Brothers and their extended network of bands, the three-day event featured additional acts from the jam, rock, blues and country worlds.

See also

List of blues festivals

References

External links

Music festivals established in 2012
Music festivals in Pennsylvania
Blues festivals in the United States
Folk festivals in the United States
2012 establishments in Pennsylvania
Tourist attractions in Scranton, Pennsylvania
August events